The Strizh is a Russian locomotive-hauled, low-floor, high-speed express train.

Main information
The trains have been running between Moscow and Nizhny Novgorod since 1 June 2015 and between Moscow and Berlin since 17 December 2016.
On the Moscow – Nizhny Novgorod line, they make 1 to 3 stops, linking the two cities in 3 hours 35 minutes (when they only stop in Vladimir).  The cars are pulled by an EP20 locomotive.

In 2016, Russian Railways also connected Moscow and Berlin using the Strizh. The travel time between the two cities is a little over 20 hours.

Lines
The Strizh train currently operates on two lines: 
 Moscow – Nizhny Novgorod (via Vladimir, Kovrov and Dzerzhinsk)
 Saint-Petersburg – Samara (via Moscow, Vladimir, Kovrov, Dzerzhinsk, Nizhny Novgorod, Arzamas, Saransk, Syzran)
Previously the train was in operation on international line:
 Moscow – Berlin (via Smolensk, Minsk, Brest and Warsaw)

Moscow – Nizhny Novgorod line 
The Strizh trains run between Moscow and Nizhny Novgorod since 1 June 2015. They make 1 to 3 stops on the line: in Dzerzhinsk, Kovrov and Vladimir. The travel time between Moscow and Nizhny Novgorod is between 3 hours 35 minutes, when it stops only in Vladimir, and up to 3 hours 50 minutes with 3 stops.
The cars are pulled by an EP20 locomotive.

Another fast train, the Lastochka ("Swallow") operates on the same line but makes 6 stops: in Orekhovo-Zuyevo, Vladimir, Kovrov, Vyazniki, Gorokhovets and Dzerzhinsk, travelling between Moscow and Nizhny Novgorod in 4 hours 6 minutes.

Moscow – Berlin line 
The Strizh trains were in operation between Moscow and Berlin since 17 December 2016 to 15 March 2020. Later this international route was canceled due to the COVID-19 pandemic and closing of borders between countries.

The initial schedule was 2 trains per week, between Moscow Kurskaya and Berlin Ostbahnhof, linking both stations in 20 hours 14 minutes westbound (instead of 24h 49min previously) and 20 hours 35 minutes eastbound (compared with 25h 56min previously). The trains leave from Moscow on Saturdays and Sundays, and from Berlin on Sundays and Mondays.
They made intermediate stops in Smolensk, Orsha, Minsk, Brest, Terespol, Warsaw, Poznan, Rzepin and Frankfurt (Oder). 
 
The Strizh trains to/from Berlin left and arrived at the Moscow Smolenskaya station (also called Moscow Belorussky) instead of Moscow Kurskaya. Between June 2017 and June 2019, some modernization work on a  railway section between Warsaw and Poznan will force the trains to take a detour which will make the trip longer. After this renovation the speed limit will be  on all the length of this section.

Moscow and Berlin were also connected once weekly by the non-Strizh trains from the Moscow–Paris line, which depart from Moscow on each Wednesday evening and from Berlin on each Saturday morning. These trains, using RIC wagons, link both cities in about 24 hours.

Media

Locomotives, used in operation

Interiors

See also
 Sapsan
 Lastochka

References

External links

 Video coverage of the Moscow-Berlin link launch in 2016
 New Swift international train makes first journey with passengers from Moscow to Berlin

High-speed rail in Russia
Railway services introduced in 2015
Articles containing video clips